Manasvi is an Indian name. Notable people with the name include:

S. Manasvi, Indian architect, filmmaker, and writer
Manasvi Mamgai (born 1989), Indian actress, model, and producer

Indian given names